Shabqadar Tehsil is a tehsil in Charsadda District,  Khyber Pakhtunkhwa, Pakistan. The tehsil is named after Shabqadar town, which is capital and tehsil headquarter.

Administration 
Shabqadar becomes tehsil in 1988. The tehsil is administratively subdivided into 12 Union Councils of which the headquarter is Shabqadar town. Under new local government rules, Shabqadar tehsil is divided into 29 village councils (VC) and 6 neighbourhood councils (NC).

Population 
The population of Shabqadar Tehsil, according to the 2017 census, is  383,765 while according to the 1998 census, it was 240,751.

Tehsil union councils 
List of Shabqadar tehsil union councils are listed below:

 Shabqadar MC-I
 Shabqadar MC-II
 Shabqadar MC-III
 Panjpao
 Rashakai
 Matta Magul Khel
 Katozai
 Hassanzai
 Haji Zai
 Battagram
 Kangra
 Dolat pura (Daulat Pura)

See also 
 Charsadda Tehsil

References 

Populated places in Charsadda District, Pakistan
Charsadda District, Pakistan
Tehsils of Khyber Pakhtunkhwa